John Bell is a special effects artist who was nominated at the 62nd Academy Awards in the category of Best Visual effects for his work on the film Back to the Future Part II. His nomination was shared with Steve Gawley, Michael Lantieri and Ken Ralston.

He also works as a concept artist for films.

Selected filmography

 Star Trek IV: The Voyage Home (1986)
 Back to the Future Part II (1989)
 Back to the Future Part III (1990)
 The Rocketeer (1991)
 The Lost World: Jurassic Park (1997)
 Pirates of the Caribbean: On Stranger Tides (2011)
 Rango (2011)
 G.I. Joe: Retaliation (2013)

References

External links

Living people
Special effects people
Year of birth missing (living people)
Best Visual Effects BAFTA Award winners